Ninia espinali, Espinal's coffee snake, is a species of snake in the family Colubridae.  The species is native to Honduras and El Salvador.

References

Ninia
Snakes of Central America
Reptiles of Honduras
Reptiles of El Salvador
Reptiles described in 1995